Sono Osato (born January 1, 1960) is an American artist born in Baden Baden, Germany. She attended Arizona State University and California College of the Arts.  Osato's work includes sculptures and paintings. Both often include found objects, such as machine parts and animal bones. Her work attempts to blend the boundaries between artistic disciplines. Her works, the Silent Language and Buried Language series, deal primarily with the intersection of language and topography.

Collections
Osato's painting Meena is part of the permanent collection at the de Young Museum in San Francisco. Mandala With Doorknob is in the collection of the Oakland Museum of California.

Notes

1960 births
Living people
People from Baden-Baden
Arizona State University alumni
California College of the Arts alumni
21st-century American painters
20th-century American painters
20th-century American sculptors
21st-century American sculptors
American women painters
American women sculptors
20th-century American women artists
21st-century American women artists